David Malcolm Carter (born 16 June 1972) is an English golfer.

Carter was born in Johannesburg, South Africa, and represented his country of birth at junior level. He later moved to England and turned professional in 1989. After several visits to qualifying school he had his rookie season on the European Tour in 1995. His best season was 1998, when he won the Murphy's Irish Open, which remains his only official money victory on the tour, and finished 19th on the Order of Merit. However he is probably best known for winning that year's World Cup for England in partnership with Nick Faldo. He also won the 1996 Indian PGA Championship.

In March 1997 Carter almost lost his life when he required emergency brain surgery after collapsing in his hotel in Dubai.

Carter moved to the Czech Republic in 2008. In April 2010, he opened his first golf academy at the Albatross Golf Course – David Carter Albatross Golf Academy.

Professional wins (3)

European Tour wins (1)

European Tour playoff record (1–0)

Other wins (2)
1996 Indian PGA Championship
1998 World Cup of Golf (with Nick Faldo)

Results in major championships

Note: Carter only played in The Open Championship.
CUT = missed the half-way cut
"T" = tied

Team appearances
Professional
Alfred Dunhill Cup (representing England): 1998
World Cup (representing England): 1998 (winners)

References

External links
 

English male golfers
European Tour golfers
Golfers from Johannesburg
Sportspeople from Prague
1972 births
Living people